Greece has been competing at the 2013 Summer Universiade in Kazan, Russia from 6 July to 17 July 2013. 13 athletes were part of the Greek team, winning a single bronze medal.

References

Nations at the 2013 Summer Universiade
Greece at the Summer Universiade
Summer Universiade